Fernando Saraiva Reis (born March 10, 1990) is a Brazilian weightlifter. He competed at both the 2012 Summer Olympics and the 2016 Rio Games finishing 11th and 5th overall respectively. He won a bronze medal in the 2018 World Championships, and he is a three-time Pan American Games champion.

Career

Reis competed at the 2010 Junior World Weightlifting Championships where he won the bronze medal in Snatch and placed fourth in Total. This was Brazil's first ever medal at the Weightlifting World Championships in any age group, gender or weight class. That same year he won a silver medal at the 2010 South American Games.

In April 2011, Reis tested positive for methylhexanamine and was suspended for six months. He returned just in time to win the gold medal in the 105+ kg category at the 2011 Pan American Games. With this performance he became the first Brazilian weightlifter to win a gold medal in the Pan American Games.

Reis originally placed 12th at the 2012 Olympics in the +105 kg event, but was bumped up to 11th after Yauheni Zharnasek failed a doping retest in 2016. In 2015, Reis won the gold medal at the Pan American Games with the championship record and Brazilian record (Snatch: 192 kg, Clean and jerk: 235 kg, Total: 427 kg). Reis finished in 10th at the 2015 World Weightlifting Championships and set the Brazilian record in snatch with 195 kg.

At the 2016 Summer Olympics he finished 5th in the Men's +105 kg, and broke the Panamerican Record in the Clean and Jerk and Total (195 in Snatch and 240 in Clean & Jerk, total 435 kg). In 2019 he won his third consecutive gold medal at the 2019 Pan American Games in the +109 kg category.

At the 2018 Pan American Weightlifting, he again broke his Americas Snatch record by lifting 201 kg. In the Clean & Jerk he made 235 kg, and in the overall total, 436 kg, winning gold in all three events.

At the 2018 World Championships, held in November, Reis obtained a historic 4th place for Brazil in the overall total, the country's best position of all time, with the mark of 436 kg (201 kg in the snatch and 235 kg in the Clean & Jerk). He came very close to winning the bronze medal, when he lifted the weight to 245 kg in the Clean & Jerk, but the judges did not consider the lift valid because of the position of the arms. On March 20, 2021, the International Weightlifting Federation announced that Rustam Djangabaev's results at the 2018 World Championships have been nullified. Reis was then promoted to bronze medal position in total, and fourth in both snatch and clean & jerk. This was Brazil's first medal in the history of the World Weightlifting Championships.

At the Pan American Games in Lima 2019, despite still recovering from knee surgery, performed at the end of 2018, he easily won the third championship, lifting 420 kg in total, against 399 for the athlete who won silver.

Records

He has set 5 Panamerican records and he currently owns the Panamerican record for all three lifts in the +105 kg weight category.

Personal life
Reis took up weightlifting aged 11. He is a fan of car racing, his idol in sport is Ayrton Senna.

Major results

References

External links

 
 
 
 

1990 births
Living people
Brazilian male weightlifters
Competitors at the 2010 South American Games
Competitors at the 2014 South American Games
Medalists at the 2015 Pan American Games
Medalists at the 2019 Pan American Games
Olympic weightlifters of Brazil
Pan American Games gold medalists for Brazil
Pan American Games medalists in weightlifting
South American Games silver medalists for Brazil
South American Games gold medalists for Brazil
South American Games medalists in weightlifting
Weightlifters at the 2012 Summer Olympics
Weightlifters at the 2015 Pan American Games
Weightlifters at the 2016 Summer Olympics
Weightlifters at the 2019 Pan American Games
World Weightlifting Championships medalists
Sportspeople from São Paulo
21st-century Brazilian people